Hyperolius ghesquieri is a species of frog in the family Hyperoliidae.
It is endemic to Democratic Republic of the Congo.
Its natural habitats are subtropical or tropical moist lowland forests, rivers, swamps, freshwater marshes, and intermittent freshwater marshes.

References

ghesquieri
Endemic fauna of the Democratic Republic of the Congo
Amphibians described in 1943
Taxonomy articles created by Polbot